Mayors of Montclair, New Jersey:

Sean Spiller, 2020 to present.
Robert D. Jackson, 1987 to 1988, 2012 to 2020.
Jerry Fried, 2008 to 2012.
Ed Remsen, 2004 to 2008.
Robert J. Russo, 2000 to 2004.
William Farlie, 1996 to 2000.
James Bishop, 1992 to 1996.
Clifford Lindholm II, 1988 to 1992.
Laurence J. Olive, 1986 to 1987.
James Ramsey, 1984 to 1986. 
Mary V. Mochary (born 1942), 1980 to 1984.
 Grant Gille, 1976 to 1980. Last mayor to serve in Montclair under its commission form of government before the township reconfigured to a Township Council model.
Matthew G. Carter, 1968 to 1972. First black mayor of Montclair, New Jersey.
Harold Hayes, c. 1966.
Harold S. Osborne, 1961 to 1964.
Bayard H. Faulkner, (1894–1983) c. 1950.
Howard F. McConnell, (1873-1933) 1920 to 1924.
Louis F. Dodd, c. 1914.
Ernest C. Hinck, c. 1911.
Henry V. Crawford c. 1907.
David Doremus Duncan, 1904 to 1907.

References